Vision of Disorder is the first album by Roadrunner Records band Vision of Disorder, released on October 22, 1996.

Track listing 

"Element" - 3:12
"Watering Disease" - 2:34
"Through My Eyes" - 3:38
"Viola" - 4:18
"Liberation" - 3:36
"Divide" - 1:50
"Ways to Destroy One's Ambition" - 2:52
"Suffer" - 2:55
"Zone Zero" - 3:58
"D.T.O." - 4:04
"Excess" - 3:10
"Gloom" - 2:57

References 

1996 albums
Vision of Disorder albums